Outback Steakhouse is an American chain of Australian-themed casual dining restaurants, serving American cuisine, based in Tampa, Florida. The chain has over 1,000 locations in 23 countries throughout North and South America, Asia, and Australia. It was founded in March 1988 with its first location in Tampa by Bob Basham, Chris T. Sullivan, Trudy Cooper, and Tim Gannon. It was owned and operated in the United States by OSI Restaurant Partners until it was acquired by Bloomin' Brands, and by other franchise and venture agreements internationally.

History
Canadian Outback Steakhouse restaurants began in 1996. In March 2009, Outback Steakhouse Canada abruptly closed all nine locations in the province of Ontario, citing poor economic conditions, but in June 2009, Outback Steakhouse opened a location in Niagara Falls, Ontario. A second location in Niagara Falls has been opened, but these are the only Outback Steakhouse locations operating in Canada.

Outback Steakhouse opened in the UK with a website at Outbackpom.com and locations in Birmingham, Basildon, Enfield, Romford, Stevenage and Staines.  By September 2011, only its Basildon and Romford stores remained and this closed down on September 13, ending Outback's foray into the UK market.

On June 14, 2007, OSI Restaurant Partners completed a stock repurchase plan, and the company became privately held. In April 2012, Bloomin' Brands, the current owner of Outback Steakhouse, filed with the SEC to raise up to $300 million in an initial public offering.

Bloomin' Brands, Inc. became a publicly traded company on NASDAQ under the ticker symbol "BLMN."

Menu

Bloomin' Onion

The Bloomin' Onion is a signature Outback item, though this dish is rare to unheard of in Australia. It is a one-pound onion cut to 'bloom' open, breaded, deep-fried and served with mayonnaise-horseradish sauce. Other restaurants offer items similar to the Bloomin' Onion, as in Chili's Awesome Blossom (discontinued), Texas Roadhouse's Cactus Blossom, and Lone Star Steakhouse & Saloon's Texas Rose. Many of the Bloomin' Onions have come under fire for high-calorie counts, sometimes going over 1,500 calories.

Involvements

Community
Outback Steakhouse has a program to support the communities in which its restaurants are located. They have also joined GroupRaise, a platform where non-profits can book restaurant fundraisers in their locations. On a national level, Outback partners with Heineken USA and their Heineken with a Heart program to raise funds for various organizations in these communities.

Political

The company and its founders are major contributors, via the Outback Steakhouse PAC, to the Republican Party, contributing $303,015 and $334,197 for the 2000 and 2004 election cycles, respectively. The Outback Steakhouse PAC itself is one of the largest donors in the food and beverage sector, second only to the National Restaurant Association, which itself represents 300,000 restaurants.

Advertising
The company owns two blimps: the Bloomin' Onions I and II, both named after their appetizer.
 For several years, the company ran a media campaign with an Australian-themed variation of the Of Montreal composition "Wraith Pinned to the Mist (And Other Games)."
 General (Ret) Tommy Franks sits on the Board Of Directors for OSI Restaurant Partners, INC., which owns Outback Steakhouse.

Sports
Outback Steakhouse was the title sponsor of the Outback Champions Series tennis events and NCAA football's Outback Bowl. The sponsorship lasted through 2020.

Outback is also a partner of the Tampa Bay Lightning and has a concession stand in Amalie Arena.

Motorsports

In 2012, Outback Steakhouse became a sponsor of the Ryan Newman and the No. 39 Chevrolet for Stewart-Haas Racing in the NASCAR Sprint Cup Series. In their first race as sponsor, Newman won the 2012 Goody's Fast Relief 500 at Martinsville Speedway. One of the promotions the company had with Newman is a free Bloomin' Onion on the Monday after a race in which Newman would finish in the Top 10. Kevin Harvick took over Outback's sponsorship and promotion in 2014 for two races in their No. 4, after Newman left the team to drive Richard Childress Racing's No. 31 car. The company was on Harvick’s car from 2014 until 2018, including his championship in 2014, and in 2019 and until the COVID-19 Pandemic in 2020, the steakhouse was a personal sponsor which kept the Blooming Monday promotion around still. It ended after 2020. The company also sponsored retired Sprint Cup Series driver and current Fox NASCAR announcer Jeff Gordon's No. 67 for the AC-Delco 200 in the Busch Series during the 1990 season.

References

External links

 
 Salon article on Outback Steakhouse

Steakhouses
Restaurant chains in the United States
Restaurant franchises
Theme restaurants
Australian-themed retailers
American companies established in 1988
Restaurants established in 1988
Companies based in Tampa, Florida
Restaurants in Florida
1988 establishments in Florida
Bloomin' Brands
Steakhouses in Australia
Multinational restaurant chains